Abdoulaye Méïté (born 6 October 1980) is an Ivorian former professional footballer. He represented Ivory Coast internationally and was awarded a total of 48 caps.

Club career

Red Star 93
Méïté's first club at the age of 17 was the Division 2 Paris side, Red Star 93. He joined the club in 1998, before being snapped up by Olympique de Marseille.

Olympique de Marseille
Méïté joined Marseille in July 2000, where he made 172 league appearances, as well as many in European competitions – including one against Bolton in January 2006. Whilst at Marseille, he started in the 2004 UEFA Cup Final.

Bolton Wanderers
Méïté moved to Bolton Wanderers in July 2006. He scored two goals for Bolton: one in the 3–1 FA Cup defeat to Arsenal on 14 February 2007, and the other in a 1–1 draw with ZFK Rabotnički Kometal of Macedonia in the UEFA Cup on 20 September the same year.

He was involved in controversy during Bolton's defeat against Manchester United at Old Trafford in March 2008. Manager Gary Megson blamed him for two goals that Bolton had conceded in the first half of the game (both scored by Cristiano Ronaldo), and Méïté refused to come out for the second half. He claimed he was unfit to carry on, but the Bolton medical staff confirmed that there was no injury. Megson subsequently forced Méïté to train with the reserves, and the player was widely expected to move on from the Reebok Stadium. He never played for Bolton again; he was not selected for any of the remaining eight Premier League fixtures in the 2007–08 season. He had previously missed only twelve League games in the two years he had been at Bolton, and five of these were while he was representing Ivory Coast in the African Nations Cup in January and February 2008.

West Bromwich Albion
As the 2008–09 season approached, Méïté was linked with Premier League newcomers West Bromwich Albion and Hull City, both of which had bids accepted by Bolton. Méïté chose to sign for West Brom on 10 August 2008 for an initial fee of £2 million, which could rise to £2.5 million depending on appearances. The contract covers three years, with a fourth year in the club's favour. Meïté made his debut in a 1–0 defeat to Arsenal in the opening game of the 2008–09 Premier League season.

His first season at West Brom was interrupted by a series of injuries, with four separate spells out of the side restricting him to 18 appearances. For the first ten Championship games of the 2009–10 season, Shelton Martis was preferred by the Baggies' new first team coach, Roberto Di Matteo, and there was speculation that Méïté might be allowed to leave. Following a disappointing run of results, culminating in a catastrophic defensive display against Barnsley when Martis scored an own goal, Méïté returned to the side against Preston North End on 3 October, and Albion conceded just four goals in the next eight games. Following a 4–0 win away to Sheffield Wednesday at the end of November, Di Matteo picked out Méïté and his central defensive partner Jonas Olsson for praise: "Jonas leads the back four most of the time but Abou is also doing a great job."

Having played 20 games in the Championship promotion season, mostly alongside Olsson in the centre of defence, Méïté was left out in the cold by Di Matteo in the 2010–11 Premier League campaign, playing only in the League Cup. Since the sacking of Di Matteo in early 2011, due to a poor sequence of results, Méïté has seen a revival under the tutelage of new head coach Roy Hodgson.

To the surprise of many Albion fans, Méïté was brought back to partner Olsson against Stoke City, which added to the 3–3 draw vs West Ham under caretaker manager Michael Appleton, has resulted in a 7-game unbeaten run, including a 2–1 home win over Liverpool.

The organizational skills brought in by Hodgson has galvanized the Albion defensive unit, with Méïté bringing a composed, positional sense to the controlled aggression of Olsson.

On 25 May 2011, Méïté was released by West Bromwich Albion.

Dijon
On 30 June 2011, Méïté was signed by Ligue 1 newcomers Dijon FCO.
With the club's relegation to Ligue 2, Méïté left the club. In September 2012, he started training with AS Cannes to maintain his fitness.

FC Honka
On 25 March 2013, Méïté was signed by Veikkausliiga side FC Honka. He was selected as the Veikkausliiga Player of the Month and in the Team of the Month for August 2013.

Doncaster Rovers
On 9 January 2014, Méïté signed for Doncaster Rovers in a deal until the end of the season.

Ross County
On 12 February 2015, Méïté signed for Ross County on a free transfer until the end of the season. He was one of 14 players released by Ross County at the end of the season.

Seinäjoen Jalkapallokerho
In February 2016, Méïté signed a one-year contract with Finnish Veikkausliiga side Seinäjoen Jalkapallokerho. He left SJK on 31 August 2016, after his contract was terminated by mutual consent.

Newport County
On 25 November 2016, Méïté joined Welsh side Newport County on non-contractual terms. He made his debut the following day in a 4–1 defeat against Blackpool as a second-half substitute. He was released by Newport County on 14 January 2017.

FC Lusitanos

In November 2017, he signed with FC Lusitanos in Andorra.

Honours

Club
Marseille
Intertoto Cup: 2005
UEFA Cup runner-up: 2003–04

Ivory Coast
Africa Cup of Nations runner-up: 2006

References

External links

1980 births
Living people
Sportspeople from Colombes
French sportspeople of Ivorian descent
Association football central defenders
French footballers
Ivorian footballers
Ivory Coast international footballers
2006 Africa Cup of Nations players
2008 Africa Cup of Nations players
2010 Africa Cup of Nations players
2006 FIFA World Cup players
Red Star F.C. players
Olympique de Marseille players
Bolton Wanderers F.C. players
West Bromwich Albion F.C. players
Dijon FCO players
FC Honka players
Doncaster Rovers F.C. players
OFI Crete F.C. players
Ross County F.C. players
Newport County A.F.C. players
Ligue 1 players
Ligue 2 players
Premier League players
English Football League players
Veikkausliiga players
Super League Greece players
Ivorian expatriate footballers
Expatriate footballers in England
Expatriate footballers in Finland
Expatriate footballers in Greece
Footballers from Hauts-de-Seine